Mattia Marchesetti (born 28 September 1983) is an Italian footballer.

Biography
Born in Crema, Lombardy, Marchesetti started his career at provincial capital – Cremona for Cremonese. In July 2004 he was signed by Serie A club Chievo in temporary deal. However, he only made his top division debut on 9 January 2005. Marchesetti returned to Cremona for 2005–06 Serie B. In January 2006 Marchesetti was signed by Sampdoria. In July 2006 he was re-signed by Chievo. However Marchesetti only played 5 times in Serie A and 4 times in 2006–07 Coppa Italia. In January 2007 Marchesetti left for Triestina.

In August 2007 Marchesetti was signed by Vicenza in co-ownership deal for €250,000 in 4-year contract. However, he failed to play regularly either in 2007–08 Serie B. In January 2008 Vicenza signed him outright for another €150,000, as part of Luca Rigoni's deal.

On 25 June 2008, 5 days before the closure of 2007–08 financial year, Marchesetti and Riccardo Fissore were sold to Mantova for €1M and €500,000 respectively, which made Vicneza had a profit of €625,000 and €481,250 respectively in accounting. However, the payment was only via the transfer of registration rights of Valerio Di Cesare (€1M) and Simone Calori (€500,000). All 4 players signed 3-year contract. The deals made both clubs had benefit on the field as well as in accounting.

Marchesetti played 35 times for Mantova in 2008–09 Serie B, however most of them as substitutes (11 starts). He never played for the Veneto club in 2009–10 Serie B despite under contract. He became free agent after the club bankrupted. Marchesetti joined Alessandria for 2010–11 Lega Pro Prima Divisione. After another disappointing season Marchesetti moved to non fully professional football in Serie D, for Pizzighettone, Sant'Angelo Lodigiano and Olginatese.

Footnotes

References

External links
 Lega Serie A profile 
 La Gazzetta 2009–10 profile 
Profile at Football.it 
 

Italian footballers
U.S. Cremonese players
A.C. ChievoVerona players
U.C. Sampdoria players
U.S. Triestina Calcio 1918 players
L.R. Vicenza players
Mantova 1911 players
U.S. Alessandria Calcio 1912 players
A.S. Pizzighettone players
Serie A players
Serie B players
Association football midfielders
People from Crema, Lombardy
1983 births
Living people
A.C. Gozzano players